Alik Magin is a former Australian rules footballer. He played for the Gold Coast Suns as a rookie list player during the 2011 and 2012 AFL seasons.

Playing career
Magin was drafted to Gold Coast in the 2011 Rookie Draft. He was elevated from the rookie list to replace Jeremy Taylor and made his debut in Gold Coast's first game, playing against Carlton in round 2 of the 2011 season.

At the end of the 2012 AFL season, Magin was delisted by the Suns. He signed for Victorian Football League club Bendigo Gold, and played with them for two seasons, winning a best and fairest award, until the club folded at the end of 2014.

References

External links

1991 births
Living people
Sportspeople from the Sunshine Coast
Australian rules footballers from Queensland
Gold Coast Football Club players
Bendigo Football Club players